Recilia is a genus of bugs from the family Cicadellidae. As of Webb & Viraktamath (2009), it includes just two species, with the vast majority of former species now in the genus Maiestas. Before this, the genus was sometimes treated as a subgenus of Deltocephalus.

Species
Recilia coronifer (Marshall, 1866)
Recilia raoi (Dash & Viraktamath, 1998)

References

 
Cicadellidae genera
Deltocephalini